The 54th Academy of Country Music Awards was held at the MGM Grand Garden Arena in Las Vegas, Nevada on April 7, 2019. Nominations were announced on February 20, 2019 by Reba McEntire during CBS This Morning, with Chris Stapleton and Dan + Shay leading with six nominations each. McEntire returned to host the awards for the sixteenth time.

Jason Aldean was presented with the ACM's rare honor "Artist of the Decade" by previous holder George Strait.

Winners and Nominees 
The winners are shown in bold.

Performances

Presenters

Reception 
In its review of the event, Rolling Stone Country praised that the ACMs took the opportunity to bring seasoned musicians Amanda Shires and Charlie Worsham "into the fold" by having them appear alongside Luke Combs and Keith Urban respectively but criticised that the ACMs did not introduce either of them or even feature them on screen. Worsham, who the reviewer believed should have been nominated for his own awards, performed "mostly in the shadows" and Shires, who "helped transform [Combs' performance] with her lyrical playing" was barely seen. Rolling Stone also praised Reba McEntire's hosting and the performances by Dierks Bentley and Brandi Carlile, Little Big Town, Miranda Lambert and Ashley McBryde but stated that it was "baffling" that Kacey Musgraves, who had five nominations and won the CMA Award for Album of the Year and four Grammy Awards including Best Country Album and the all-genre Album of the Year for Golden Hour, did not perform. Musgraves' win made her only the third artist (after Taylor Swift and the artists that appeared on Oh Brother, Where Art Thou?) to win the ACM, CMA and Grammy Awards for Best Country Album as well as the all-genre Grammy for Album of the Year.

See also
Academy of Country Music Awards

References

Academy of Country Music Awards
Academy of Country Music Awards
Academy of Country Music Awards
Academy of Country Music Awards
Academy of Country Music Awards
Academy of Country Music Awards
Academy of Country Music Awards